Fra Semplice da Verona (c. 1589, Verona – 1654, Rome) was an Italian painter of the Baroque era, active in Verona. He was a friend of Paolo Massimo and trained with Marcantonio Bassetti. Also known as Fra Semplice of Verona. He painted in Venice and Rome. He painted a St Felix, Martyr for a church in Castelfranco. He also painted The ousting of the unworthy guest once owned by Charles I of England.

Sources

1580s births
1654 deaths
16th-century Italian painters
Italian male painters
17th-century Italian painters
Painters from Verona